The following are international rankings of Tunisia.

Demographics

United Nations: Population, ranked 79 out of 223 countries
CIA World Factbook: Urbanization ranked 67 out of 193 countries

Economy

 The Wall Street Journal and Heritage Foundation: Index of Economic Freedom 2009, ranked X out of 179 countries
World Bank: Ease of Doing Business Index 2009, ranked 69 out of 181 countries
International Monetary Fund: GDP per capita 2008, ranked 96 out of 179 countries
World Bank: GDP per capita 2008, ranked 89 out of 170 countries 
CIA World Factbook: GDP per capita 2008, ranked 103 out of 192 countries

Education

United Nations gross enrolment ratio 2005, ranked X out of 177 countries
United Nations Development Programme: literacy rate 2007/2008, ranked 128 out of 177 countries

Geography

Total area ranked X out of 233 countries and outlying territories
Renewable water resources ranked X out of 174 countries

Military

CIA World Factbook: Military expenditures ranked X out of 171 countries
CIA World Factbook: Military expenditures ratio to GDP, ranked X out of 174 countries

Politics

Transparency International:  Corruption Perceptions Index 2007, ranked 61 out of 179 countries
Reporters Without Borders: Worldwide Press Freedom Index 2008, ranked X out of 173 countries
The Economist EIU: Democracy Index 2008, ranked X out of 167 countries

Transportation

Motor vehicles per capita ranked 68 out of 140 countries

International rankings

References

Tunisia